Holy Family Hospital is a 345 bed multi-specialty hospital run by the New Delhi Holy Family Hospital Society and managed by the Delhi Catholic Archdiocese. It is registered as charitable Non-Profit Organisation under the Societies Registration Act XXI of 1860. Founded by the Medical Mission Sisters in 1953.

History
The Holy Family Hospital, Okhla Road in New Delhi, India, was founded by the Medical Mission Sisters in 1953. The foundation stone was laid by Sarvapalli Radhakrishnan, Vice President of India in the presence of Rajkumari Amrit Kaur, India’s Minister of Health. Subsequently the running of the hospital was handed over to the Delhi Catholic Archdiocese in 1990.

At present Anil Joseph Thomas Couto, Archbishop of Delhi is the Chairman of the Governing Body of the hospital. Rev. Father George PA is the Director and Dr. Sumit Ray is the Medical Superintendent.

Holy Family Hospital is registered under the Delhi Nursing Home Act and is NABH and NABL Accredited hospital. The Hospital has value based system and quality assurance is regulated by Mr.Kannu Sharma

In 2019, the injured protesters of the Citizenship Amendment Act protests were admitted to the AIIMS and the Holy Family Hospital.

References

External links
Hospital Website
Holy Family Orthopedics 

Hospitals in Delhi
Hospitals established in 1953
1953 establishments in India